A  (Spanish), also known as  or , is a national identity document in many countries in Central and South America. The term "cédula" may also colloquially refer to the number on the identity document.

The term  (Latin) means, in general, an order or authorization; in earlier times such a document on the authority of a king, or a royal decree, which for Spain and Spanish America was a decree issued directly by the monarch.

Central America
In Central America, the cédula de identidad is valid for border crossings between three Central American countries: Guatemala, Honduras, and El Salvador.

Costa Rica

In Costa Rica, in recent years, a cédula de identidad, has been a credit card-sized plastic card. On one side, it includes a photo of the person, a personal identification number, and the card's owner personal information (complete name, gender, birth date, and others), and the user's signature. On the reverse, it may include additional information such as the date when the ID card was granted, expiration date of the ID card, and other such as their fingerprints, and all the owner's information in PDF417 code. The cards may include several security measures, including the use of ultraviolet coating. In the near future in Costa Rica, the cédulas de identidad will also be used in the digital signature process.

Guatemala
In Guatemala, the national ID is called DPI (Documento Personal de Identificación / Personal Identification Document), mandatory for anyone 18 or older to have (although no penalty exists for not having one). It's a credit card-sized eID card required for everything; from opening a bank account to paying taxes to receiving Social Insurance.

See also
Identity document
List of identity card policies by country
Community Tax Certificate (Philippines)

Notes

External links
Cédula Dominicano de Identidad
Security measures in Chile

Identity documents
Government of Chile
Government of Costa Rica
National identity cards

es:Documento de identidad